Walter J. LaBuy (July 25, 1888 – September 29, 1967) was a United States district judge of the United States District Court for the Northern District of Illinois.

Education and career

Born in Dodge County, Wisconsin, LaBuy received a Bachelor of Laws from DePaul University College of Law in 1912. He was in private practice in Chicago, Illinois from 1912 to 1933. From 1930 to 1933, he was a member of the Cook County Board of Commissioners. He served as a Judge of the Circuit Court of Cook County from 1933 to 1944.

Federal judicial service

LaBuy was nominated by President Franklin D. Roosevelt on March 7, 1944, to a seat on the United States District Court for the Northern District of Illinois vacated by Judge William Harrison Holly. He was confirmed by the United States Senate on March 29, 1944, and received his commission on March 31, 1944. He assumed senior status on January 31, 1961, serving until his death on September 29, 1967.

Notable case

LaBuy presided over the well-known trial of automaker Preston Tucker.

References

Sources
 

1888 births
1967 deaths
Judges of the United States District Court for the Northern District of Illinois
United States district court judges appointed by Franklin D. Roosevelt
20th-century American judges
DePaul University College of Law alumni
Members of the Cook County Board of Commissioners
Judges of the Circuit Court of Cook County (pre-1964 reorganization)